, is a Japanese vocalist best known for his work on theme songs for tokusatsu and anime. A resident of Ibaraki Prefecture, he began his career as founding member and lead vocalist of the band "WHY" in 1981 before making his solo debut in 1984, singing the opening theme for the "Super Sentai" tokusatsu television series Choudenshi Bioman.

In the 1980s and 1990s, he would soon go on to be well known for a wide selection of tokusatsu music; notably a great number of insert themes contributed to Super Sentai series such as the opening for Choudenshi Bioman, as well as the opening and closing themes for Ginga Nagareboshi Gin and Kamen Rider Black RX and opening themes for the Metal Hero Series Tokyuu Shirei Solbrain, and Tokusou Exceedraft. He has also contributed vocals for insert themes to the animated television series Kinnikuman, Galaxy Angel Z and The King of Braves GaoGaiGar.

Discography

Tokusatsu

Choudenshi Bioman (1984) 

  (opening theme)
 
 Blue Togetherness
 
 
  (ending theme)
  (live)

Uchuu Keiji Shaider (1984)

Choushinsei Flashman (1986)

Jaaman Tanteidan Maringumi (1987)

Kamen Rider Black RX (1988) 

  (opening theme)
 
 
 
 
 
 
  (ending theme)

Tokkei Winspector (1990) 

  (opening theme)
 
 
 
 
 
  (ending theme)

Tokkyuu Shirei Solbrain (1991) 

  (opening theme)
 
 
 
 
 
 
 
  (ending theme)

Tokusou Exceedraft (1992) 

  (opening theme)
 
 
 LAST FIGHTER
 
  
 
 
 
 
 
  (ending theme)

Ninja Sentai Kakuranger (1994)

B-Robo Kabutack (1997) 

 *

Seijuu Sentai Gingaman (1998)

Kyuukyuu Sentai GoGo-V (1999) 

 
 STOP THE WARS

Mirai Sentai Timeranger (2000)

GoGo Sentai Boukenger (2006) 

 
  with Akira Kushida & MoJo for GoGo Sentai Boukenger vs. Super Sentai

Juken Sentai Gekiranger (2007) 

 "

Engine Sentai Go-onger (2008)

Crusher Kazuyoshi: Ikare! (2009)

Jikuu Senshi Ibaliger R (2009) 
  (opening theme)

Samurai Sentai Shinkenger (2009)

Tensou Sentai Goseiger (2010)

Kaizoku Sentai Gokaiger (2011)

Anime

Kinnikuman (1983) 
 Berlin no Akai Ame ("Red Rain of Berlin", Brocken Jr.'s image song)
 Akuma no Mougyuu ("Devil Buffalo", Buffaloman's image song)
 Jigoku no Sanmyaku ("Hellish Mountains", The Mountain's image song)
 Fukumen no Kariudo ("Mask Hunter", Big The Budo's image song)
 Kyoufu no Kaiten Drill ("Dreaded Spinning Drill", Screw Kid's image song)
 Moero! Housou Seki ("Burn! Announcer Chair", Yoshigai and Nakano-san's image song)

Yume Senshi Wingman (1984) 
 Aku! Retsu! Wingman
 Shook! Wingman
 Desire

Video Senshi Laserion (1984) 
 Video Senshi Laserion (opening theme)
 Hikari no Sekai
 We're ready

Kochira Katsushika-ku Kameari Kōen-mae Hashutsujo (film; 1985) 
 Hashutsujo no Yoru wa fukete
 Policeman wa Tsuyoi zo!

Dragon Ball (1986)

Ginga: Nagareboshi Gin (1986) 
 Nagareboshi Gin ("Shooting Star Gin", opening theme)
 Shouri no Uta ("Song of Triumph")
 Kokoro no Kiba ("Fangs of the Heart")
 FIRE
 Hoero Gin ("Howling Gin")
 Otoko-Tachi, Nakama-Tachi ("The men were allies")
 TOMORROW (ending theme)

Kamen no Ninga Akakage (1987) 
 Kuroi Takurami

Kidou Keisatsu Patlabor (OVA, 1988) 
 Kidou Keisatsu Patlabor

Shōnan Bakusōzoku 5: Aozameta Akatsuki (1989) 
 COOL RIDER

Casshern (OVA, 1993) 
 Kibou Shigosen ~Horizon Blue~

Mach Go Go Go (1997) 
 Great Devil Exerion

The King of Braves GaoGaiGar (1997) 
 Saikyo Yuusha Robo Gundan ("Strongest Brave Robot Corps")

Galaxy Angel Z (2002) 
 Tatakae! Our XXX

Galaxy Angel A/AA (2002/2003) 
 Tatakae! Angel Five

Other

Akane Maniax 
 Tekkumen no Uta / Song of Tekkumen (テックメンの歌)

GR Chouzetsu Gattai SRD 
 Otoko do Ahou Kazoe Uta (男どアホウ数え唄)

Game Tengoku 
 Tatakae! Washidake no Mutekinder Z (戦え!わしだけのムテキンダーZ)

GUN Bare! Game Tengoku 
 Washi ga Seishun no Muteki Wing (わしが青春のムテキウイング)

Maajan Mokushiroku 
 THE GREAT MANG-GANG

Tech Romancer 
 Kimi wo Sagasu Tsubasa (君を探す翼)
 Stand Up! Soldiers ~Erabare Shishia-Tachi~ (Stand Up! Soldiers~選ばれし者たち~[Giant Fighter])

Uchuu Eiyuu Monogatari 
 Astronauts ~ Uchuu Hikoushi No Ballad (Astronauts～宇宙飛行士のバラード)

External links 
 ★tomorrow (Takayuki Miyauchi's weblog on Yahoo! Japan)
 Bucchigiruze

Japanese male singers
1955 births
Living people
Musicians from Ibaraki Prefecture
Anime musicians